Barney's 1-2-3-4 Seasons is the sixth Barney & Friends home video. It features an array of traditional children's songs and school songs. This video also works on Actimates Barney.

Plot
BJ just cannot wait to play all of his favorite outdoor games and sports. But it never seems to be the right season of the year. Barney and his friends help BJ, and with four magical jars and a little bit of imagination, they experience spring, summer, fall and winter – all in one fantastic day of seasonal fun!

Cast
 Barney (voice) – Bob West
 Barney (body costume) - David Joyner
 BJ (voice) – Patty Wirtz
 BJ (body costume) - Jeff Brooks
 Maria – Jessica Hinojosa
 Tosha – Hope Cervantes
 Rebecca – Erica Reynolds
 Shawn – John David Bennett, II

Songs
 "Barney Theme Song" (tune: "Yankee Doodle")
 "A-Tisket, A-Tasket"
 "I Just Can't Wait"
 "Growing"
 "Taking Turns"
 "The Raindrop Song"
 "A Silly Hat"
 "What a Baseball Day!"
 "He Waded in the Water"
 "I Like Autumn"
 "Go Round and Round the Village"
 "Winter's Wonderful"
 "Sledding, Sledding" (tune: "Sailing, Sailing")
 "I Just Can't Wait" (Reprise) 
 "I Love You" (tune: "This Old Man")

Barney & Friends
Films based on television series
Mattel Creations films
1990s English-language films